MindFire Inc. provides personalized URLs and landing page technology to the graphic arts and marketing communication industries.

MindFire's main product, LookWho’sClicking, is a web-based application that simplifies the creation, management and tracking of personalized URLs, VIP landing pages, pay per click (PPC) and mass media landing pages, as well as automated follow-up email and real-time reporting.

The company typically delivers LookWho’sClicking through print service providers, agencies and consultants. MindFire headquarters are in Southern California, but the company also has offices in Idaho, New Jersey, New York, Arizona and Asia-Pacific.

History
MindFire Inc. was started in 1999 by Moe Farsheed (CEO) and Dave Rosendahl (EVP Operations). They partnered with companies like First American who were looking for better ways to track information about the demographics of their clients, or Cal State Fullerton's Institute for Economic and Environmental Studies who wanted to research the regional economy and environment. In 2005, MindFire changed their approach and began selling to print service providers, who were then able to offer the software to their clients. Partners that integrate MindFire services into their software offerings include Hewlett Packard, Kodak, and Canon.

Software
LookWho’sClicking software tracks response and online activity, gathering information about the recipients’ preferences, automatically routing leads to the appropriate sales person by email and generating reports that provide real-time insight into how the campaign is doing.

LookWho’sClicking has four workflows (known as campaign blueprints)—the Attract Blueprint, the Click-Capture Blueprint, the Hand Off Blueprint and the Attract Express Blueprint.

The Attract Blueprint is used with personalized URLs, the Click-Capture Blueprint is used with PPC advertising, the Hand Off Blueprint attracts users to the page and then transfers them to a third party website, and the Attract Express is similar to Click-Capture, but uses other types of mass media such as television or radio to reach their audience.

Awards
Inc. 500  No. 327  Fastest Growing Private Companies  2009
Inc. 500  No. 20  Fastest Growing Software Companies  2009
Print09  Must See 'Ems Recognition for MarketFire  2009
Inc. 500  No. 152  Fastest Growing Private Companies  2008
Inc. 500  No. 6  Fast Growing Software Companies  2008

Philanthropic work
In 2008, MindFire, Inc. along with Hewlett Packard, co-sponsored a Corazón Project Day after the 2008 DSCOOP annual conference in San Diego. Many attendees of the DSCOOP conference chose to stay an extra day in order to go down to Tecate, Mexico and build a house for a needy family. MindFire and Hewlett Packard both made contributions to pay for the materials needed to build the home.

Notes

Companies based in Irvine, California
Software companies based in California
Software companies of the United States